Keisha Bell Sowell (born December 20, 1979) is an American former soccer player who was a defender for the United States women's national soccer team.

Career
Bell helped win the NCAA championship with the University of Florida in 1998 as a freshman and earned recognition on the NCAA's all-tournament team. She later served as a volunteer coach for the team in 2003.

Personal life
Bell is married to Ronnie Sowell. She works as a teacher at Woodcreek Middle School in Houston, and has four children.

International career statistics

References

1979 births
Living people
People from Spring, Texas
Soccer players from Texas
American women's soccer players
Florida Gators women's soccer players
Women's association football defenders
United States women's international soccer players
American women's soccer coaches
Florida Gators women's soccer coaches
Schoolteachers from Texas
American women educators